William F. Double (June 10, 1910 – December 28, 1996) was an American lawyer and politician.

Born in Milwaukee, Wisconsin, Double went to Ripon College, Marquette University, and received his law degree from Marquette University Law School. Double served in the Wisconsin National Guard and the Temporary Coast Guard Reserve. Double practiced law, worked as a lobbyist, and was involved with the banking business. Double served in the Wisconsin State Assembly from 1939 to 1944 and was a Republican. Double died in Mequon, Wisconsin.

References

Politicians from Milwaukee
Military personnel from Milwaukee
Ripon College (Wisconsin) alumni
Marquette University alumni
Marquette University Law School alumni
Businesspeople from Milwaukee
Wisconsin lawyers
Republican Party members of the Wisconsin State Assembly
1910 births
1996 deaths
20th-century American businesspeople
20th-century American politicians
20th-century American lawyers